Olesya Hudyma, also known as Olesya Petrivna Hudyma (born 10 May 1980) is a modern Ukrainian painter.

Early life and education 
Olesya Hudyma was born in Ternopil, Ukraine on May 10, 1980. In 2003, she graduated with a degree in Journalism from the Lviv University. Afterwards, she worked as a journalist in Ternopil print media. In 2007, she quit journalism to become a full-time painter.

Career 
In August 2018, the Ukrainian Postal Service issued a postage stamp with O. Hudyma's picture "Bride", as a part of "Love is Life" series. Another picture, "Tree of Life" was used for a First Day Cover. Her artworks are displayed in private collections in Ukraine, United States, Canada, Armenia, England, France, Germany, Switzerland, Italy, Spain and Poland.

In December 2022 Hudyma had her first solo exhibition in Italy.

Personal Life 
In 2022, due to the ongoing Russian invasion of Ukraine, Hudyma relocated with her family to Rivalta, Italy.

References 

1980 births
Living people
21st-century Ukrainian painters
21st-century Ukrainian women artists
Contemporary painters
Artists from Ternopil
Ukrainian women painters